Graham Fyfe (18 August 1951 – 19 April 2022) was a Scottish professional footballer, best known for his time with Rangers, who played as a winger.

Career
Fyfe made his first appearance for Rangers at Ibrox in league match against Heart of Midlothian on 25 March 1969. He started on the right wing in a 3–2 home win. He went on to make 70 appearances for the club, including the first match against Ajax in the first ever European Super Cup. Fyfe also scored 23 goals which was not bad at all from a midfielder.

He left to join Hibernian after seven seasons in Govan, but his stay in Edinburgh was short lived, as he moved on to Dumbarton the following year. He played at Boghead Park for two seasons before moving to the US to play with Major Indoor Soccer League sides Pittsburgh Spirit and Cleveland Force.

In 1980, Fyfe said that he had to leave Rangers because he had married a girl who was Catholic. However, the media of the period approached other Rangers players who had married Catholic women, including Bobby Russell (who played 370 games for Rangers), and they did not support Fyfe's claims.

Fyfe signed with the St. Louis Steamers in 1983 and spent one season with them.

Death
Fyfe died in April 2022, at the age of 70.

Honours
Rangers
 European Cup Winners' Cup: 1971–72
 Scottish Football League: 1974–75, 1975–76
 Scottish Cup: 1972–73, 1975–76
 Scottish League Cup: 1970–71, 1975–76

References

External links 
 
 MISL stats
 Graham Fyfe as Aussie Footballers

1951 births
2022 deaths
Footballers from Motherwell
Scottish footballers
Association football wingers
Scottish Football League players
National Soccer League (Australia) players
Major Indoor Soccer League (1978–1992) players
Rangers F.C. players
Hibernian F.C. players
Dumbarton F.C. players
Adelaide City FC players
Pittsburgh Spirit players
Cleveland Force (original MISL) players
St. Louis Steamers (original MISL) players
Scottish expatriate footballers
Scottish expatriate sportspeople in the United States
Expatriate soccer players in the United States